Lanatopyga is a genus of moths of the family Noctuidae.

Species
 Lanatopyga ronkaygabori Gyulai & Ronkay, 2002

References
Lanatopyga at funet

Xyleninae